Amata dissimilis is a moth of the family Erebidae. It was described by George Thomas Bethune-Baker in 1911. It is found in Kenya.

References

 Natural History Museum Lepidoptera generic names catalog

Endemic moths of Kenya
dissimilis
Moths described in 1911
Moths of Africa